David Bernard Lipschultz (June 2, 1970 – January 3, 2004) was an American freelance journalist. His work appeared in The New York Times, Smart Money, and USA Today as well as such high tech magazines as Wired, Red Herring, and Internet World.

Career
Lipschultz and his wife wrote, produced, and hosted "The Week in Aspen" on Channel 16. The show covered nightlife and entertainment in Aspen. His work focused mainly on entertainment and business. Prior to being a journalist, he lived in New York City and worked in marketing and public relations.

Family
Lipschultz married Juliana Tauber in October 2002. The two met on a ski-lift in Aspen.

Death
He died in a skiing accident, falling into a tree well, in Aspen, Colorado in 2004 at age 33.

References

External links
Obituary in Phoenix Jewish News
Obituary in Aspen Times

1970 births
2004 deaths
Place of birth missing
21st-century American journalists